Bostra pallidifrons is a species of snout moth in the genus Bostra. It was described by George Hampson in 1917. It is found in South Africa.

References

Endemic moths of South Africa
Pyralini
Moths described in 1917
Moths of Africa